This is a complete list of Texas Tech University presidents of Texas Tech University in Lubbock, Texas.

Presidents

References

External links
 Texas Tech University – Office of President

Texas Tech
Presidents
Texas Tech University presidents